The Nepal women's national football team is controlled by the All Nepal Football Association and represents Nepal in women's international football competitions. It is a member of the Asian Football Confederation and the South Asian Football Federation and has yet to qualify for the World Cup or an AFC Women's Asian Cup.

This is a list of the Nepal women's national football team results from the earliest known record to the present day.

2020s

2010s

2000s 
The team did not play any competitive matches between 2000 and 2010.

1990s

1980s 

* Nepal score always listed first

Competitive record
*Draws include knockout matches decided on penalty kicks.
***Red border colour indicates tournament was held on home soil.

Women's World Cup

AFC Women's Asian Cup

SAFF Women's Championship

Olympic Games

Asian Games

South Asian Games

See also 
 Nepal national football team results

References

Results
Women's national association football team results